An always-on display (AOD) is a smartphone feature that has the device continue to show limited information while the phone is asleep. It is widely available on Android handsets, and is available on Apple iPhones since the iPhone 14 Pro. On some Android devices, the feature is sometimes called Ambient Display or Active Display, depending on its implementation and behavior. Depending on the phone's design, it may be a replacement or complementary to another feature, such as the notification LED.

Overview
A device with AOD enabled keeps a limited portion of the screen on during sleep mode. An Always On Display may display a set of recent push notifications in place of a notification tone or LED signal, as well as information such as the time, date, and battery status of the device; they often may also be configured to also show various types of notifications as they arrive, or screensavers.

Various devices have differing behavior for this feature. Some phones would have the screen off until new notifications arrive whereupon the display would either be active for a few seconds or remain on until the user interacts with the device to read or dismiss the notification (essentially having the entire screen serve as a larger notification LED); others instead have the phone screen activate when it detects input, such as being picked up or the screen interacted with. These versions are often called ambient displays, in contrast to "true" always-on displays, where at least part of the screen remains on at all times. Again depending on the manufacturer, not all apps may be supported for showing notifications with this feature - only first-party apps or popular apps may be supported.

History
This technology was first introduced by Nokia in on the Nokia N70 and Nokia 6303 (on TFT display in 2008), and more widely adopted with its next generation AMOLED Symbian phones in 2010 (the Nokia N8, C7, C6-01 and E7). Later functionality was updated with Nokia Sleeping Screen app for last generation of Symbian smartphones (Nokia 808 and other) with features like custom standby screen from any image, and two themes for notifications design. It became a standard feature on most Nokia Lumia Windows Phones in 2013, paired with the Nokia Glance Screen app. The feature has since become more widely available on Android handsets. Apple has the feature since Apple Watch Series 5 (2019) and on iPhone 14 Pro in 2022.

Battery impact
The Always On Display feature does consume energy, although the Samsung Galaxy S7 series phones, and later phones that made the feature popular are built with AMOLED screens that turn off black pixels. On today's AMOLED phone displays, it is true that only a few pixels may need to be turned on but they do need to be moved to prevent pixel burn in. Colors, sensors and processors all consume energy while AOD is in use, which leads to an extra consumption of roughly 3% battery.

On LCD displays, the backlight has to be turned on, even if only a part of the screen is showing information, so this feature consumes a significant amount of power compared to a notification LED. Some LCD displays use Transflective LCD. It uses a layer called a transflector. It is typically made from a sheet polymer. It is similar to a one-way mirror but is not specular. Some smartwatches such as the Pebble Smartwatch and the Amazfit Stratos also use this technology. Under bright illumination (e.g. when exposed to daylight) the display acts mainly as a reflective display with the contrast being constant with illuminance.

Typically, an ambient display solution which turns on the screen only when notifications are present, remains on, but turns off when they are dismissed will consume the least amount of battery power while still drawing the user's attention when required, in contrast to an Always-on Display which will keep the screen on, all of the time, to show some information, even if notifications may not be present. Since the date and time are less essential than battery status or notifications which may require the user's immediate attention, an AOD can be customized in many app-based implementations to only show notifications or selectively choose what is shown.

Scheduled on/off times
In some phones, the Always On Display/Ambient Display feature can be toggled on a schedule, such as during nighttime, or when the proximity sensor detects that the device is in a pocket. There may be an option for the phone to keep the screen on only when there are notifications to be acknowledged or dismissed by the user.

References 

Mobile phones
Display devices